Wang Mengshu (24 December 1938 – 20 September 2018) was a Chinese tunnel and railway engineer. He was a key engineer behind China's first subway tunnel and the development of China's high-speed railways. Wang was an academician of the Chinese Academy of Engineering. He was a deputy to the 11th National People's Congress.

Biography
Wang was born in Wen County, Henan on December 24, 1938. From September 1952 to August 1955 he studied architecture at Tianjin Railway Engineering Institute. After graduation, he was accepted to Tangshan Railway Institute (now Southwest Jiaotong University), studying tunnel and underground engineering under Gao Quqing. After college, he was assigned to Beijing Metro Corporation, he began working on China's first underground subway line, Line 1 in Beijing.

In 1966, Mao Zedong launched the Cultural Revolution, Wang forced to work in the fields instead of working in the company. In 1978, Wang was transferred to the Scientific Research Institute of Chengdu Railway Administration as an engineer, where he worked there for more than 40 years. In 1981, Wang took part in designing and building the Dayaoshan tunnel between Pingshi and Lechang townships in south China's Guangdong province. The tunnel was completed in 1989. In 1995 he was elected a fellow of the Chinese Academy of Engineering. In his later years, he devoted his energy to building and expanding China's high-speed railway systems.

In September 2017, Wang was hospitalized with a cerebral hemorrhage. On September 20, 2018, Wang died in Beijing, aged 79.

Awards
 1992  Special prize in the National Science and Technology Progress Awards

References

1938 births
2018 deaths
People from Jiaozuo
Members of the Chinese Academy of Engineering
Southwest Jiaotong University alumni
Engineers from Henan
Academic staff of Beijing Jiaotong University